Lucien Ballard, A.S.C. (May 6, 1908 – October 1, 1988) was an American cinematographer. He worked on more than 130 films during his 50-year career, collaborating multiple times with directors including Josef von Sternberg, John Brahm, Henry Hathaway, Budd Boetticher, Raoul Walsh, Sam Peckinpah and Tom Gries. He was nominated for an Academy Award for Best Cinematography for The Caretakers (1963).

Biography
Ballard was born in Miami, Oklahoma in 1908. His mother Ada was Cherokee and Lucien is listed on the Dawes Rolls as 1/16th Cherokee by Blood. He attended the University of Oklahoma and the University of Pennsylvania and after graduating, he became a surveyor.

Ballard began working on films at Paramount Studios in 1929 after dating a script woman there. He later joked in an interview that it was a three-day party at the home of actress Clara Bow that convinced him "this is the business for me". He began his career loading trucks at Paramount and trained to be a camera assistant. He was taken on as an assistant to Lee Garmes on Josef von Sternberg's Morocco (1930). Von Sternberg allowed him credit as a second cameraman on The Devil is a Woman (1935), and the two shared a Venice Film Festival award for Best Cinematography in 1935. Von Sternberg promoted him to director of photography on Crime and Punishment (1935) and The King Steps Out (1936), based on the life of Empress Elisabeth of Austria, both at Columbia Pictures. After filming Dorothy Arzner's Craig's Wife also at Columbia, he settled into making B movies such as The Devil's Playground (1937), Penitentiary and The Lone Wolf in Paris, both 1938. While at Columbia, he also shot several two-reel comedies, including a number with The Three Stooges. In an interview with Leonard Maltin, he said he enjoyed working on them because it gave him the freedom to experiment with different lenses and filters, which likely would not have been permitted on features.

Ballard filmed Let Us Live! (1939) for John Brahm and made more films with him including Wild Geese Calling (1941) and The Lodger (1944). On the set of The Lodger, Ballard met and then married actress Merle Oberon; they remained married from 1945 until 1949. He photographed 4 more of her films – This Love of Ours (1945), Temptation (1946), Night Song (1948), Berlin Express (1948). After she was involved in a near fatal car crash in London, he invented a light which was mounted by the side of the camera, to provide direct light onto a subject's face, with the aim of reducing the appearance of blemishes and wrinkles. Named the "Obie", the device benefited Oberon, who had sustained facial scarring in the car accident. The Obie became widely used in the film industry.

In 1941's Howard Hughes film The Outlaw, Hughes cast Jane Russell in the lead and had numerous shots of her cleavage, which got the attention of the Hollywood censors. The film was shot in 1940 and 1941 but took five years to be released to selected theaters. Ballard was the camera man for the screen tests, did some of the second unit work for director Howard Hawks, and assisted cinematographer Gregg Toland on the first unit crew. He also filmed Laura (1944) for Rouben Mamoulian until Otto Preminger took over as director.

On Morocco, Ballard had also worked with assistant director Henry Hathaway. This relationship with Hathaway came back to benefit Ballard when Hathaway himself became a director. They worked together on five films, including Diplomatic Courier (1952), Prince Valiant (1954), The Sons of Katie Elder (1965), Nevada Smith (1966), and True Grit (1969). The last, because of the natural beauty of southwestern Colorado, garnered Ballard acclaim among his peers. He also worked on a segment of O. Henry's Full House (1952) with him.

After working with Budd Boetticher on The Magnificent Matador (1955), they worked together on six feature films, including The Killer Is Loose (1956), Buchanan Rides Alone (1958),The Rise and Fall of Legs Diamond (1960), A Time for Dying (1969) and Arruza (1971) as well as the television show Maverick (1957) and the documentary My Kingdom For... (1985).

He made The House on Telegraph Hill (1951) and The Desert Rats (1953) for Robert Wise; Return of the Texan (1952) and Susan Slade (1961) with Delmer Daves; three films with Raoul Walsh including The King and Four Queens (1956) and Band of Angels (1957); and three films with Roy Ward Baker, including Inferno (1953), often considered the best shot color 3D film of the era. He also worked with Stanley Kubrick on The Killing (1956).

Ballard was nominated for an Academy Award for Best Cinematography for The Caretakers (1963).

Another relationship of importance was with Sam Peckinpah. They worked together on The Westerner (1960 television series), Ride the High Country (1962), The Wild Bunch (1969), The Ballad of Cable Hogue (1970), The Getaway (1972), and Junior Bonner (1972). He won the National Society of Film Critics award for Best Cinematography for The Wild Bunch.

He also formed a partnership with Tom Gries making five films, including Will Penny (1968) and Breakheart Pass (1976). His last feature film was Joan Rivers' Rabbit Test (1978) starring Billy Crystal in his film debut.

Ballard died at the age of 80 in 1988, two days after being involved in a car accident near his home in Indian Wells, California.

Personal life
Ballard had been married before Oberon and was married for a third time in 1949 to Inez Pokorny, a world traveler and photographer who is sometimes credited as the first woman to explore the Amazon River from the Atlantic to the Pacific, who was killed in an automobile accident in 1982. He had two sons, Christopher and Anthony. Ballard also had two daughters, Zoe and Pamela from his first marriage to Margaret J McLellan.

Partial filmography

 Crime and Punishment 1935
 The King Steps Out, 1936
 The Final Hour
 Craig's Wife, 1936
 The Devil's Playground, 1937
 Racketeers in Exile, 1937
 Penitentiary, 1938
 Rio Grande (1938)
 The Lone Wolf in Paris, 1938
 Squadron of Honor (1938)
 The Thundering West, 1939
 Texas Stampede (1939)
 Let Us Live!, 1939
 Wild Geese Calling, 1941
 The Lodger, 1944
 This Love of Ours, 1945
 Temptation, 1946
 Berlin Express, 1948
 Night Song, 1948
 Fixed Bayonets!, 1951
 The House on Telegraph Hill, 1951 
 Don't Bother to Knock, 1952
 Diplomatic Courier, 1952
 Return of the Texan, 1952
 Night Without Sleep, 1953
 Inferno, 1953
 The Desert Rats, 1953
 Prince Valiant, 1954
 The Magnificent Matador, 1955
 The King and Four Queens, 1956
 The Killing, 1956
 A Kiss Before Dying, 1956
 The Killer Is Loose, 1956
 Band of Angels, 1957
 Buchanan Rides Alone, 1958
 Murder by Contract, 1958
 The Rise and Fall of Legs Diamond, 1960
 Marines, Let's Go, 1961
 Susan Slade, 1961
 The Parent Trap, 1961
 Ride the High Country, 1962
 The Caretakers, 1963
 The Sons of Katie Elder, 1965
 Nevada Smith, 1966
 Hour of the Gun, 1967
 Will Penny, 1968
 The Party, 1968
 The Wild Bunch, 1969
 A Time for Dying, 1969
 True Grit, 1969
 The Ballad of Cable Hogue, 1970
 The Hawaiians, 1970
 Elvis: That's the Way It Is, 1970
 Arruza, 1971
 The Getaway, 1972
 Junior Bonner, 1972
 Lady Ice, 1973
 Breakout, 1975
 Breakheart Pass, 1976
 Rabbit Test, 1978
 My Kingdom For..., (1985)

References

External links
 Ballard @ the Internet Encyclopedia of Cinematographers
 
 Ballard @ Allmovie

1908 births
1988 deaths
American cinematographers
Cherokee Nation artists
People from Miami, Oklahoma
Road incident deaths in California
University of Pennsylvania alumni
20th-century Native Americans